Sara Lomax-Reese is an American journalist and media executive and entrepreneur. Lomax-Reese is the president and CEO of WURD Radio, the only African-American owned talk radio station in Pennsylvania.

Early life

Lomax-Reese is one of six siblings and the youngest daughter of Walter P. Lomax Jr., a physician and entrepreneur. Lomax purchased WURD 900 AM in 2003.

Lomax-Reese attended The George School, a Quaker boarding and day high school, in Newtown, Pennsylvania, where she graduated in 1983. She attended the University of Pennsylvania, Philadelphia and graduated from there in 1987. She is also a graduate of the Columbia University Graduate School of Journalism.

Career

Lomax-Reese co-founded the magazine HealthQuest: Total Wellness for Body, Mind & Spirit, the first nationally circulated African-American consumer health magazine in the country. She has written for The Atlanta Journal-Constitution, The Miami Herald, The Philadelphia Inquirer, Essence Magazine, and American Visions Magazine. Her essay “Black Mothers/Sons” is featured in the 2016 book "Our Black Sons Matter".

Lomax-Reese has taught communications at Oglethorpe University in Atlanta, Georgia, and a collaborative course at the University of Pennsylvania.

Honors and awards

In 2019, Lomax-Reese was elected to Arcadia University's Board of Trustees.

Bibliography

Contributor to "Our Black Sons Matter: Mothers Talk about Fears, Sorrows, and Hopes" (Rowman & Littlefield, 2016)

References 

Living people
American people of African descent
21st-century American journalists
American women journalists
21st-century American writers
21st-century American women writers
University of Pennsylvania alumni
Year of birth missing (living people)